Sheila Makhijani (born 1962) is a New Delhi based artist.

Life and career 

Born in New Delhi, Makhijani attended College of Art, Delhi, where she completed a Masters in Arts degree.  In 1993, she studied at Kanazawa Bijutsu Kogei Daigaku, or Kanazawa College of Art, in Kanazawa, Japan, and she has since participated in a number of workshops and art festivals, including the Khoj International Artists Workshop in both 1998 and 2001, and the 7th Asia Pacific Triennial, in 2012. Her works have been exhibited internationally in the Netherlands, India, and Australia, including at Museum of Modern Art (MoMA) in New York, Queensland Art Gallery in Brisbane, Australia, Perth Institute of Contemporary Arts in Perth, Australia, and Talwar Gallery, which currently represents the artist, in New York and in New Delhi. Makhijani currently lives and works in New Delhi.

Work 

Makhijani's work spans a variety of media. Although her drawings have been said to be her "primary engagement," she has works regularly in a range of materials, including painting, gouache, mixed-media, collage, and sculpture. Makhijani's artistic practice, in fact, blurs the lines between media; she seems to carve space onto her canvases and within her paintings, which result from a process of accretion and erasure, while her sculptures often read as three-dimensional drawings. The inclusion of Makhijani's piece "Take a leap" in the Museum of Modern Art (MoMA)'s 2010 exhibition, On Line: Drawing Through the Twentieth Century, calls attention to this intermingling of dimensions in Makhijani's oeuvre; the work, which is a kind of collage of drawings on paper, stitched together with thread, concretises the act and the space of drawing. Her paintings and gouaches, often vividly coloured, feature webs of undulating, interweaving lines that both question and transgress the very boundaries they create. Although almost exclusively non-figurative, Makhijani’s works possess an energy and movement that seem to pulsate with life; her lines have been called “moving spirits refusing to be tied down,” forms that “take on a life of their own,” full of “untrammeled glee.” Each of Makhijani’s works creates its own world, as animate and as vivid as the one beyond its edges, playfully enticing the viewer into an exploration of the relationship among line, color, and space.

Solo exhibitions
 2020: Talwar Gallery, Take a Listen, New York, NY, US
2019: Talwar Gallery, This That and The Other, New Delhi, India
2015: Talwar Gallery, NowNotNow, New York, NY, US
 2013: Talwar Gallery, nothing to really know, New Delhi, India
 2010: Talwar Gallery, TOSS, New York, NY, US
 2009: Bodhi Art Gallery, Scuttle, Mumbai, India
 2005: Talwar Gallery, BLIP!, New York, NY, US
 2004: Talwar Gallery, Recent Works, New York, NY, US
 2000: Galerie Foundation For Indian Artists, Amsterdam, Holland
 2000: Art Inc., New Delhi, India
 1996: Galerie Foundation for Indian Artists, Amsterdam, Holland
 1994: Galerie Schoo, Amsterdam, Holland
 1993: Gallery 17, Kanazawa, Japan
 1992: Galerie Schoo, Amsterdam, Holland
 1989: Centre For Contemporary Art, New Delhi, India

Selected group exhibitions 
 2015: Kiran Nadar Museum of Art, WORKING SPACES, New Delhi, India
 2012: Queensland Art Gallery, 7th Asia Pacific Triennial, Brisbane, Australia
 2010: Museum of Modern Art, On Line, New York, NY, US
 2008: Vadehra Gallery, Fluid Structures: Gender and Abstraction, New Delhi, India
 2005: Talwar Gallery, (desi)re, New York, NY, US
 2002: Talwar Gallery, Subba Ghosh/Sheila Makhijani, New York, NY, US
 2001: Foundation for Indian Artists and Jim Beard Foundation, Bollywood Has Arrived, Schipol, Amsterdam, Netherlands
 2000: Mis-Understanding, Utrecht Holland
 1999: Perth Institute of Contemporary Art, 'Bilkool,''' Perth, Australia
 1998: Makerere Gallery, Uganda, Africa
 1997–1998: "Gift for India," Exhibition organised by SAHMAT
 1995: Rabindra Bhavan, Emerging Trends,'' New Delhi, India

External links 
 The Indian Express, "Taking the Line for a Walk," April 2019. 
 Artforum, "Critic's Pick: Sheila Makhijani," April 2019.
 Art India, "The Secret Life of Sheila Makhijani," October-December 1999.

References 

1962 births
Living people
Indian women painters
20th-century Indian painters
20th-century Indian women artists
Women artists from Delhi
Painters from Delhi
21st-century Indian women artists